Mesosingeria is a genus of fossil foliage attributable to the Cycadales. This genus is found in Early Cretaceous rocks from Argentina.

Taxonomy 
The genus was erected by Sergio Archangelsky based on material from the Anfiteratro de Ticó Formation in Argentina to include two species, namely M.coriacea and M. herbstii. The name of the genus is dedicated to the mycologist Rolf Singer.
Other five species were later added to the genus from the same localities.

Description 
The genus includes foliage fossils of bipinnate leaves with a flat rachis. The pinnules are oblong to lanceolate, alternate, with one or more veins entering each pinnule, then dichotomizing and continuing straight to the apex. The cuticle presents monocyclic stomata which are usually sunken in a stomatal pit constricted by a ring of cuticle on the outside.

References

Cycads
Prehistoric gymnosperm genera